Uskorenie (literally meaning acceleration) was a slogan and a policy announced by Communist Party General Secretary Mikhail Gorbachev on 20 April 1985 at a Soviet Party Plenum, aimed at the acceleration of political, social and economic development of the Soviet Union.

History 
In May 1985, Gorbachev delivered a speech in Leningrad (now Saint Petersburg), during which he admitted the slowing down of the economic development and inadequacy of living standards. This was the first time in history that a Soviet leader had done so.

The acceleration was planned to be based on technical and scientific progress, revamping of heavy industry (in accordance with the Marxian economics postulate about the primacy in development of heavy industry over light industry), taking the "human factor" into account, and increasing the labour discipline and responsibility of apparatchiks. In practice it was implemented with the help of massive monetary emission infused into heavy industry, which further destabilised the economy and in particular brought an enormous disparity between actual cash money and virtual money used in cashless clearings between enterprises and state and among enterprises.

The politics of mere "acceleration" eventually failed, which was de facto admitted in June 1987 at a Party Plenum, and the  slogan was phased out in favor of the more ambitious  (restructuring of the whole economy).

See also 
 500 Days
 Perestroika
 Glasnost
 Khozraschyot
 Demokratizatsiya
 Dissolution of the Soviet Union
 Transition economy

References 

Ideology of the Communist Party of the Soviet Union
Reform in the Soviet Union
Economic history of the Soviet Union
Russian political phrases
1985 neologisms
Mikhail Gorbachev
Soviet phraseology
1980s in the Soviet Union
Perestroika